Pudsey Grammar School is a secondary school with a sixth form in Pudsey, West Yorkshire, England. It serves over 1300 pupils from the town and surrounding area. The school has a large Sixth Form of over 260 students offering 20 A level courses and 6 Applied General courses.

History

It was first established in 1905 under the name Pudsey and District Secondary School, meeting in Pudsey Town Hall until the school's first purpose-built building opened on Richardshaw Lane in 1911, with construction having started in mid-1909. The name changed to Pudsey Grammar School in 1944 and was known by this name until 1980 at which point the name changed to Pudsey Grangefield School. It was later given the status of a specialist college of Maths and Computing. In September 2021 the school changed its name back to Pudsey Grammar School.

The school's logo is the coat of arms of Pudsey, bearing the slogan "Be Just and Fear Not". The logo is built into the face of the original Grammar School Building; this Grade II listed building at the front of the old site has been converted into flats, and the rest of the site was demolished to make an open recreational area for the new building.

The school has only had six Headteachers since 1911.  On 21 September 2009, the school was visited by the Deputy Prime Minister, John Prescott. The school was also visited in 2010 by Labour leadership candidate and former Foreign Secretary David Miliband, who described the new building as "a great monument to Labour government".

Behaviour Hub

In April 2022 Pudsey Grammar School was named as part of the expansion of the Department for Education's national Behaviour Hubs programme as one of only 18 Lead Secondary schools nationally. This is in recognition of the school's 'exemplary behaviour culture'.

Notable former pupils

 Jerry Brotton, Chair of Renaissance Studies at Queen Mary, University of London and presenter of the BBC series Maps: Power, Plunder and Possession
 Carolynne Good, finalist on Fame Academy
 Matthew Hoggard, England cricketer
 Nile Wilson, Olympic gymnastics bronze medallist on the horizontal bar in Summer 2016

Pudsey Grammar School
 Sir Len Hutton, opening batsman for England and Yorkshire
 Peter Ransley, screenwriter
 David Shutt, Baron Shutt of Greetland OBE
 Dudley Williams FRS, Professor of Biological Chemistry from 1996 to 2006 at the University of Cambridge; his work led to effectiveness of the antibiotic vancomycin

References 

Secondary schools in Leeds
Pudsey
Educational institutions established in 1911
1911 establishments in England
Foundation schools in Leeds
Specialist maths and computing colleges in England